The Stade Umuganda is a multi-use stadium in Gisenyi, Rwanda.  It is currently used mostly for football matches, on club level by Etincelles FC and Marines F.C. of the Rwandan Premier League. The stadium has a capacity of 5,000 spectators. The Stade Umuganda has an artificial turf field and a training field as well. There are also four team dressing rooms as well as VIP and media sections. This stadium hosted the Pool D matches of the 2016 African nations championship. Floodlights and a scoreboard are expected to be added by November 2016.

References

External links
 http://www.rwandasport.com/playground/13-rwanda-national-football-league/9-umuganda-stadium
 http://www.newtimes.co.rw/section/article/2015-11-04/194103/

Football venues in Rwanda